West Lampeter Township is a township in central Lancaster County, Pennsylvania, United States. The population was 17,365 at the 2020 census.

History
The Johannes Harnish Farmstead, Christian and Emma Herr Farm, Hans Herr House, Lime Valley Covered Bridge, Neff's Mill Covered Bridge, Park Site, Rock Ford Plantation, and Weber-Weaver Farm are listed on the National Register of Historic Places.

Geography 
The Conestoga River forms part of the northern boundary of the township, and Pequea Creek forms the southern boundary. The township is bordered to the north by the city of Lancaster and contains the unincorporated communities of Lyndon, Mylin Corners, Lampeter, Lime Valley, and part of Willow Street.

Demographics 

At the 2000 census there were 13,145 people, 5,284 households, and 3,762 families living in the township.  The population density was 800.0 people per square mile (308.9/km).  There were 5,467 housing units at an average density of 332.7/sq mi (128.5/km).  The racial makeup of the township was 97.35% White, 0.79% African American, 0.05% Native American, 0.60% Asian, 0.01% Pacific Islander, 0.70% from other races, and 0.50% from two or more races. Hispanic or Latino of any race were 1.72%.

There were 5,284 households, 27.6% had children under the age of 18 living with them, 63.4% were married couples living together, 5.3% had a female householder with no husband present, and 28.8% were non-families. 26.1% of households were made up of individuals, and 17.8% were one person aged 65 or older.  The average household size was 2.42 and the average family size was 2.91.

The age distribution was 22.5% under the age of 18, 5.1% from 18 to 24, 24.3% from 25 to 44, 19.7% from 45 to 64, and 28.3% 65 or older.  The median age was 44 years. For every 100 females, there were 87.5 males.  For every 100 females age 18 and over, there were 83.6 males.

The median household income was $51,043 and the median family income  was $61,053. Males had a median income of $41,944 versus $26,848 for females. The per capita income for the township was $24,713.  About 2.2% of families and 3.1% of the population were below the poverty line, including 3.4% of those under age 18 and 4.2% of those age 65 or over.

Sports

References

External links

Populated places established in 1841
Townships in Lancaster County, Pennsylvania
Townships in Pennsylvania
1841 establishments in Pennsylvania